Bryan Welch is the former publisher and editorial director of Ogden Publications and an author and speaker on eco-friendly matters. He is author of the 2011 book Beautiful and Abundant: Building the World We Want.

Ogden Publications 
Welch began Ogden Publications in 1996 based in Topeka, Kansas. Key brands include Mother Earth News, Mother Earth Living, Utne Reader, Grit and Community Chickens.

Sustainability & Green Initiatives 

Welch was a guest speaker at The LOHAS Forum (Lifestyles of Health and Sustainability) in June 2008.

Affiliations 
Welch is a former member of the Magazine Publishers of America board of directors. He also served on the board of directors for Social Venture Network.

Books
 Beautiful and Abundant, 2010,

References

External links
Walk the Talk Show with Waylon Lewis Interview with Bryan Welch.
Beautiful and Abundant

Living people
Year of birth missing (living people)
American environmentalists
American publishers (people)
University of Denver alumni
Harvard Kennedy School alumni